Malacothamnus mendocinensis is a species of flowering plant in the mallow family known by the common name Mendocino bushmallow. It is endemic to Mendocino County, California, where it is known from only two populations. It has a California Rare Plant Rank of 1B.1 (Plants rare, threatened, or endangered in California and elsewhere). In some treatments, Malacothamnus mendocinensis has been included within Malacothamnus fasciculatus or Malacothamnus hallii.

References

External links
Calflora Profile: Malacothamnus mendocinensis
'' Photo gallery at Calphotos

Flora of California
Endemic flora of California
mendocinensis
Natural history of Mendocino County, California
Flora without expected TNC conservation status